Road signs in the United Kingdom and in its associated Crown dependencies and overseas territories conform broadly to European design norms, though a number of signs are unique: direction signs omit European route numbers and road signs generally use the Imperial System of units (miles and yards), unlike the rest of Europe (km and m). Signs in Wales and parts of Scotland are bilingual.

A range of signs are used on British roads such as motorway signs, warning signs, and regulatory signs.

History

Modern British road signage can be traced to the development of the "ordinary" bicycle and the establishment of clubs to further the interests of its riders, notably the Cyclists' Touring Club (CTC), the National Cyclists' Union (NCU) and the Scottish Cyclists' Union (SCU). By the early 1880s, all three organisations were erecting their own cast-iron "danger boards". Importantly, these signs warned of hazards, rather than just stating distances or giving direction to places, acknowledging the fact that cyclists, like modern motorists, were unlikely to be familiar with the roads they were travelling along and were moving too fast to take avoiding action without prior warning. In addition, it was the cycling lobby that successfully pressured the government in 1888 into vesting ownership of and responsibility for roads with county councils in previously established highway districts that would be funded from taxation rather than tolls. The districts were active in the erection of semi-standardised directional signs and mileposts in the latter years of the 19th century.

The rise of motoring after 1896 saw the pattern repeated. The larger motoring clubs, notably The Automobile Association (AA) and the Royal Scottish Automobile Club (RSAC) erected their own, idiosyncratic warning boards and direction signs on a wide scale. These signs were distinguished based on their shape, rather than a symbol or writing on them. These included a white ring meaning speed limited (as marked on a small information plate below it); a white (sometimes red) diamond for a "motor notice" such as a weight restriction (given on a plate below); a red disc for a prohibition; and a red open triangle for a hazard or warning. The latter two could provide more detail by having an information plate below them, but often it was left to the motorist to guess what the sign was referring to, and it was common to have variations between different local areas for what was a prohibition or just a "notice". This format was to develop into the British road sign that was standard from 1934 until 1964. Before this time regulations for traffic signs were published under powers created by the Road Traffic Act 1930 and so national road signage specifications were only advisory.

Following a review of national signage in 1921, a limited number of warning and hazard information plates also used symbols, rather than only text. Such symbols had been developed in continental Europe as early as 1909, but before this had been dismissed by the UK which favoured the use of text. The symbols were simple silhouettes which were easy to recognise at a distance. Some were unusual, such as 'SCHOOL' (and later 'CHILDREN') was depicted by the 'flaming torch of knowledge'. The government made increasing efforts to standardise road signs in the Road Traffic Act 1930 (RTA) and regulations of 1933, being finally consolidated with the publication of the 1934 Road Traffic Acts and Regulations handbook. These saw the end of non-standard permanent signs being erected by motoring clubs, such as the black and yellow vitreous enamel AA signs (although this did not include temporary direction signs). While the RSAC had ceased erecting signs, the Royal Automobile Club (RAC) had begun to do so to RTA specifications (save for the inclusion of the RAC badge) and was very active in this respect in the late-1930s.

The 1934 national British signs included: a red disc (for a prohibition), a red open triangle (for a warning or hazard), a red ring (for an order), and a red open triangle in a circle for a new warning with an order (which had the plates 'SLOW - MAJOR ROAD AHEAD' and 'HALT AT MAJOR ROAD AHEAD', the predecessors of 'GIVE WAY' and 'STOP' signs respectively). All signs were to carry information plates mounted below them, which were illustrated with a wide range of prescribed standardised symbols, and only text when no symbol existed. The lettering and symbols were black on a white background, except for orders (like 'TURN LEFT') which were white on blue. New to the UK were the first combination sign, which incorporated information on the sign itself, the 30 miles per hour speed restriction (introduced in 1934), with '30' in black letters on a white disc surrounded by a red ring, to indicate it is an order sign. The 30 mph sign was accompanied by its 'derestriction' sign, a white disc with a diagonal black band bisecting it, which marked the end of the restriction. Neither of these signs required separate information plates. The 1934 RTA&R also clarified direction and distance signage, which remained in that form until 1964. All signs were mounted on posts painted in black and white stripes, and their reverse sides were finished black, green, or more rarely (usually after repainting) white. The 'HALT' plate was unique in being T-shaped; orders were mainly landscape and warnings always portrait. Sizes were strictly prescribed, the warning plate being  with the surmounting triangle  equal.

As part of its anti-invasion preparations during World War II, the British government instructed all navigational signposts and railway station signs to be removed, so as not to aid potential enemy ground movements. After the war ended, larger motoring associations embarked upon a programme to erect temporary road signs. These temporary signs, which were not required to conform to the standardisation laid down by the government, usually displayed the motoring association’s logo and colour-scheme.

Some road signs were subject to minor modification, mainly in the early post-World War II years. For instance, 'SCHOOL' became a schoolboy and girl marching off a kerb, 'CHILDREN' a boy and girl playing handball on a kerb's edge. A train 'CROSSING NO GATES' was given a more toy-like locomotive. Meanwhile, the triangle was inverted for 'HALT' and 'SLOW', while 'NO ENTRY' became a combination sign - a red disc bisected by a horizontal white rectangle bearing the lettering. Orders were now black on white, save for 'NO WAITING', which was black on yellow in a red ring. Some of these changes were part of an attempt to reflect European standards.

Early road signs were usually cast iron, but this was increasingly displaced by cast aluminium in the 1930s. Cast signs were designed to be maintained by being repainted with the raised lettering and symbol easily picked out by an untrained hand. This sort of sign was sometimes given an element of night use by the inclusion of glass reflectors. An alternative to casting and painting was vitreous enamelled sheet iron or steel. In the 1950s cast signs were quickly displaced by sheet metal (usually aluminium) coated with adhesive plastics; these could be made reflective, famously by Scotchlite. Such signs had become almost universal by the reforms of the early 1960s.

The major reform of UK road signage to better reflect European practice happened in two stages. The first was associated with the first motorway construction project and the development of a signage system for it by the Anderson Committee of 1957. Although it was additional to the existing signage, it set several benchmarks that were developed under the Worboys Committee of 1963 that was largely responsible for the road signage system effected from 1964, which is still current. Until Worboys, the most notable differences between European and UK signs was the use of symbols without text wherever possible, thereby increasing the internationalism of their meaning, and with their combined nature, such as warning signs having the symbol inside the triangle instead of on a separate information plate, on the continent. The Worboys Committee recommended that such practices were adopted in the UK and the 'New Traffic Signs' of 1964 were part of the most comprehensive reformation of the UK streetscape ever. Unlike previous government efforts to regulate signage, which tended to be cumulative, Worboys argued a modernist position of starting from a clean slate, with all previous signs being deemed obsolete, illegal even, therefore subject to total and systematic replacement. As a result, local authorities were charged with massive resignage programmes. Order and Prohibition signs were almost all replaced within a couple of years, with the warning and direction signs taking a longer amount of time. Few pre-1964 warning signs survived more than about ten years and while direction signs were similarly replaced more have survived as they were not deemed as essential.

The system currently in use was mainly developed in the late 1950s and the early 1960s, with additional colour-coding introduced in the mid-1980s. There were three major steps in the development of the system.

 The Anderson Committee established the motorway signing system.
 The Worboys Committee reformed signing for existing all-purpose roads.
 The Guildford Rules introduced features to indicate different categories of route.

Anderson Committee
In 1957, a government committee was formed to design signs for the new motorway network. A system was needed that could be easily read at high speed. Colin Anderson, chairman of P&O, was appointed chairman; T. G. Usborne, of the Ministry of Transport, had charge of proceedings. Two graphic designers were commissioned to design the system of signage: Jock Kinneir and his assistant (and later business partner) Margaret Calvert. The new signs were first used on the Preston bypass in 1958.

Worboys Committee

The UK government formed another committee in 1963 to review signage on all British roads. It was chaired by Sir Walter Worboys of Imperial Chemical Industries.
The result was a document that defined traffic signing in Britain, the Traffic Signs Regulations and General Directions (TSRGD). It was first introduced on 1 January 1965 but has been updated many times since. It is comparable with the Manual on Uniform Traffic Control Devices in the United States.  The TSRGD is a Statutory Instrument that prescribes the sign faces and permitted variants that may be used on UK roads.
The TSRGD is supported by the Traffic Signs Manual (TSM), which consists of eight separately-published chapters which provide "the codes to be followed in the use, siting, and illumination of signs both on all-purpose roads and motorways. It also covers temporary signs for use in connection with road works, in an emergency by the police, and temporary route signing by motoring organisations and highway authorities."

Guildford Rules
To eliminate sign clutter in the mid-1980s, a colour-coding system was developed to indicate different route types on a single sign. The system, also adopted in the Republic of Ireland, became known as Guildford Rules, after trials in Guildford, Surrey.

Design

Detailed guidelines govern road signs in the United Kingdom. The basic units of measurement used by sign designers and typographers are the 'x-height' (the height of the lower case letter 'x') and the 'stroke width' (sw) (4 sw = 1 x-height). The sizes of borders, symbols and arrows and the spacing and layout of the sign face are expressed in sw, so that all the elements remain in proportion.

Shape
Almost all signs have rounded corners. This is partly for aesthetic reasons. It is also safer for anyone coming into contact with a sign, and it makes the sign more durable, as rain and snow are less likely to corrode the corners.

Units of measurement
The United Kingdom uses mostly imperial units on road signs for distance measurements and speed limits. Vehicle weight limits are signed only in metric (TSRGD 1981) but older signs with height, width and length restrictions may show metric units in addition to imperial. For distances only miles and yards are used. From March 2015, all new height, width and length restrictions must have dual metric-imperial units.

Colours
Three colour combinations are used on Worboys direction signs depending upon the category of the route. All roads are categorised as either motorways (white on blue), primary routes (white on dark green with yellow route numbers), or non-primary routes (black on white).

TSRGD 1994 also prescribed a system of white-on-brown direction signs for tourist and recreational attractions. TSRGD 2002 updated this and introduced a system of black-on-yellow signs for roadworks. TSRGD 2016 is the current version in force.

On Advance Direction Signs, as introduced under the Guildford Rules, the background colour indicates the category of route on which it is located. On all directional signs, destination names are placed on the colour appropriate to the category of route used from that junction. A panel of one colour on a different colour of background, therefore, indicates a change of route status. A smaller area of colour, called a patch, surrounds a bracketed route number (but not its associated destination) to indicate a higher status route that is joined some distance away. A patch may only be coloured blue or green.

Signs indicating a temporary change, such as roadworks or route diversions, are denoted with a yellow background. Usually, these signs use a simple black on yellow colour code, more complex signage use the conventional signs superimposed onto a yellow background.

In some areas, such as the Dartmoor National Park, additional signs and colours are used to distinguish road conditions. In addition to the national colour schemes, the park also uses white signs with a light blue border and text to denote routes suitable for medium-sized vehicles and white signs with a brown border and text for routes suitable for cars and small vehicles only. The park also uses fingerpost signs for routes suitable for local traffic only. These routes are publicised in park leaflets and other media.

For ease of reference, the main colour-coding rules may be summarised as below:

The colour-coding for panels on signs may be summarised as below:

Typefaces
Two typefaces are specified for British road signs: Transport and Motorway.

Transport is a mixed-case font and is used for all text on fixed permanent signs except route numbers on motorway signs. It is used in two weights: Transport Medium (for light text on dark backgrounds) and Transport Heavy (for dark text on light backgrounds).

Motorway has a limited character set consisting of just numbers and a few letters and symbols needed to show route numbers; it has elongated characters and is designed to add emphasis to route numbers on motorways. Motorway is used to sign all route numbers on motorways themselves, and may also be used on non-motorway roads to sign directions in which motorway regulations apply immediately (such as motorway slip roads). Motorway Permanent is light characters on a dark background; Motorway Temporary is dark on light.

Transport Medium and Motorway Permanent were developed for the Anderson Committee and appeared on the first motorway signs. The other two typefaces are similar but have additional stroke width in the letters to compensate for light backgrounds. These typefaces are the only ones permitted on road signs in the UK. Although signs containing other typefaces do appear occasionally in some places, they are explicitly forbidden in government guidelines and are technically illegal.

Language

Bilingual signs are used in Wales. Welsh highway authorities, until 2016, could choose whether the signs in their area were "English-priority" or "Welsh-priority", and the language having priority in each highway authority's area appeared first on signs. Most of south Wales used English-priority while western, mid, and most of northern Wales were Welsh-priority. New regulations that came into force in 2016 mandate all signs to be in Welsh first, with the existing "English-priority" signage being replaced only when they otherwise would. Bilingual signs were permitted by special authorisation after 1965, and in 1972 the Bowen Committee recommended that they should be provided systematically throughout Wales.

A small number of multilingual signs exist in the UK on major roads that leave major ports (such as the Port of Dover). They give the UK standard speed limits and remind drivers to drive on the left, in English, French, and German. Multilingual 'no stopping' signs exist in several locations on the M25.

In the Scottish Highlands and Islands, many road signs have Scottish Gaelic in green, in addition to English in black. This is part of the Gaelic language revival encouraged by many, including the Scottish Government and Bòrd na Gàidhlig.

Retroreflection
Road signs in the UK must be retroreflective in order for drivers to read them at night. There are three commonly used grades of materials used:

Class 1 (engineering grade) is a low-performance glass bead product, it was the first reflective material used on the UK network and invented by 3M. Today in the UK it is used only for street nameplates and parking signs.
Class 2 (high-intensity) is generally a microprismatic product which uses truncated cube corners to return light to the driver. It is commonly used for directional signs or less important regulatory signs. There are also high-intensity glass bead products that meet this class.
Class 3 (diamond grade) is a high end microprismatic product for important signs, those on high-speed roads and in areas of ambient lighting where a driver may be distracted by the light clutter. Class 3 can be divided into two divisions; 3A for long distance and 3B for short distance. Currently, the only product that performs to these levels is Diamond Grade DG3.

Categorisation
Road signs, markings and signals in the United Kingdom are formally categorised into sets, identifiable by the design number:
 Warning signs (5xx)
 Regulatory signs (6xx)
 Level crossing signs (7xx)
 Information signs (8xx)
 Bus, tram & cycle signs (9xx)
 Road markings (1xxx)
 Direction signs (2xxx)
 Traffic signals (3xxx)
 Signals for crossing facilities (4xxx)
 Lane control signs (5xxx)
 Road works signs (7xxx)
For clarity, signs are more commonly grouped together below

Warning signs
The importance of a warning sign is emphasised by the red border around its edge and the triangular shape. Some warning signs do not have a red border like sharp deviation. The priority of traffic through the junction is indicated by the broader line. Examples below exclude low bridges, railway and tramway level crossings, bus and pedal cycle facilities, traffic calming and road works.

Regulatory signs
Signs in circular red borders are prohibitive, whether or not they also have a diagonal red line. Circular blue signs mainly give a positive (mandatory) instruction. Such circular signs may be accompanied by, or placed on, a rectangular plate (information) that provides details of the prohibition or instruction; for example, waiting and loading plates and zone entry signs.

'Stop' signs (octagonal) and 'give way' signs (inverted triangle) are the two notable exceptions, the distinctive shapes being recognisable even if the face is obscured by dirt or snow.

Speed limit signs
The United Kingdom national speed limit for cars and motorcycles is 70 miles per hour on a motorway and dual carriageway, and 60 miles per hour on a single carriageway road. In urban areas where there is electric street lighting the speed limit is 30 miles per hour unless otherwise signed.

Low bridge signs
Signs were formerly only in feet and inches, but from 2015 new or replacement signs must contain both imperial and metric measurements. The signs used at a low bridge depend on the type above the road. If a beam bridge with a horizontal clearance, the roundel is used and the limit is a prohibition. However if the bridge is an arch over the road, warning signs are used as the height varies across the width of the carriageway. Bridges particularly at risk from strikes may have a variable message sign that is activated by high vehicles passing through an infra-red beam. When the sign is activated four amber lamps flash, the top pair alternating with the bottom pair.

Level crossing Signs
Some level crossings in the United Kingdom do not have gates or barriers. These crossings will have several signs posted on approach and at the crossing.

Bus and cycle signs
Some roads and pavements are shared with cyclists and buses. The word "local" on the bus symbol means the only buses that may use the lane are those running a local service. Where the word "local" is not shown, the lane may be used by any vehicle designed to carry more than eight passengers, excluding the driver, and local buses. Solo motorcycles may use the lane where the motorcycle symbol is shown on the signs. Other vehicles may enter and stop in a bus lane to load and unload unless signs alongside the lane indicate otherwise.

Pedestrian zone signs
Areas such as high streets and shopping areas may be signed as "pedestrian zones". Restrictions are detailed on zone entry signs and repeater plates. The entry signs may indicate that buses, taxis, disabled badge holders or permit holders may enter the zone. Examples of zone entry signs include:

Loading bays and Parking signs
Both signs and road markings indicate waiting restrictions. On-street parking places may be designated for a particular class of vehicle (e.g. solo motorcycles or car) or a specific type of user (e.g. permit holders or disabled badge holders). Parking may be free or paid for (e.g. "pay and display" or parking meters).

There may be a time limit on the period of stay and a minimum time before returning to a particular parking place. Where a plate does not indicate the days of the week, the restrictions apply at the same times on every day, including Sunday. Where the time of day is not shown, the controls apply for 24 hours. If a bank holiday falls on a day when the controls are in operation, the controls apply in the normal way unless the plate states that they do not. Special restrictions may apply on days when a large event is being held.

Motorway signs
For use on busy motorways and other wide roads where verge mounted signs would be frequently obstructed by other traffic.

An advance direction sign (ADS) generally has blue, green or white as its background colour to indicate the status of a road (motorway, primary or non-primary) on which it is placed. Except on the main carriageway of a motorway, coloured panels are used to indicate routes from the junction being signed that have a different status. A direction sign (DS) should always be a single colour indicating the status of the road to be joined, although there are a few rare exceptions to this rule.

The Heavy and Medium typefaces were designed to compensate for the optical illusion that makes dark lines on pale backgrounds appear narrower than pale lines on dark backgrounds. Hence destinations are written in mixed case white Transport Medium on green and blue backgrounds, and in black Transport Heavy on white backgrounds. Route numbers are coloured yellow when placed directly on a green background. Some signs logically show the closest destination on the route first (i.e., on top), while others show the most distant settlement first. On a roundabout DS, the route locations are usually listed with the closest destination at the bottom and the furthest away at the top when going straight ahead, and likewise going left and right. However, many left-right signs more logically indicate the closest destination at the top with further afield destinations listed in descending order.

Destinations and roads which cannot be directly accessed on a driver's current actual route, but can be accessed via an artery route of that carriageway, are displayed in brackets.

All types of ADS (but not DS) may optionally have the junction name at the top of the sign in capital letters in a separate panel.

A route confirmatory sign is placed either after a junction where distances were not shown on the ADS or DS or is placed on an overhead information sign but does not show distances to the destinations along that route.

Motorway Signals

Motorway conditions

Temporary Speed Advisories

Lane Restrictions

Motorway Closed

Directional road signs
The term "directional sign" covers both Advance Direction Signs (ADS), placed on the approach to a junction, and Direction Signs (DS) at the junction itself, showing where to turn. A DS has a chevron (pointed) end, and this type is also referred to as a flag-type sign.

Tourist Destinations

Diversion routes
Diversion routes are marked with black symbols on a yellow patch (square, triangle, circle, or diamond). These mark diversionary routes in the event that the road ahead is closed for any reasons. Motorists can navigate following the symbol and can find their way back to the original road at a junction above the closure. The four symbols may be a solid shape or just outlines. They are most commonly placed on directional signs, following the route number (e.g. A 25) but may be free standing.

Motorway exits have trigger signs that are normally covered. In the event of a closure, the sign is uncovered and will say, for instance, "To rejoin M6 follow (symbol)". Following the symbol will allow rejoining at a later junction.

On minor roads a simple black on yellow sign with an arrow and the word Diversion is used, as here.

Information signs
Informational signs are usually rectangular and generally blue with white text.

Roadworks and temporary signs
Roadworks are normally signalled with a triangular, red-bordered warning format is used to indicate that there are works ahead. The graphic is of a man digging. Within the roadworks, diversions and other instructions to drivers are normally given on yellow signs with black script.

Street name signs
Legally street name signs are not defined as traffic signs in the United Kingdom; this therefore gives authorities flexibility on the design and placement of them. They can be fixed to a signpost, wall, lamp column, or building. The text can be in many different fonts but normally either the Transport typeface used on road signs or the serif font designed by David Kindersley. In many areas, the sign will also show the name of the local authority, its coat of arms, or part of the street’s postcode.

Location identifiers
Numbered location markers of one type or another are used to identify specific locations along a road. Historically, milestones were used, but since the early 20th century they fell into disuse. However, for administrative and maintenance purposes, distance marker posts and driver location signs have been erected on motorways and certain dual carriageways.
The numbers on distance marker posts are embedded into emergency roadside telephone numbers and are used by the emergency services to pinpoint incidents.
The advent of the mobile phone meant that drivers were not accessing location information embedded into motorway emergency telephone systems, and since 2007 driver location signs have been erected on many motorways. These contain important information about the location and carriageway direction.

Traffic lights

Icon

Obsolete

Post-Worboys

Pre-Worboys

Northern Ireland

The designs of road signs in Great Britain as prescribed in the Traffic Signs Regulations and General Directions (TSRGD) apply specifically to England, Scotland and Wales. These regulations do not extend to Northern Ireland.  Traffic signs in Northern Ireland are prescribed by The Traffic Signs Regulations (Northern Ireland) 1997 and are administered by the Northern Ireland Assembly.

Northern Ireland signs are broadly the same as those in Great Britain, although changes made in Great Britain are often not made in Northern Ireland at the same time.  One example is the series of bends ahead sign, which was removed from TSRGD in 1975 but only removed from the Northern Ireland regulations in 1979.

Crown dependencies

The designs of road signs as prescribed in the Traffic Signs Regulations and General Directions (TSRGD) do not extend to other territories that come under the jurisdiction of the Crown. Road signs in the Channel Islands and the Isle of Man are under the jurisdiction of their local legislatures. Although the policy in these territories is to align their road signs with those prescribed in the TSRGD, small variations may be seen.

Isle of Man 
The Tynwald (Isle of Man Parliament), through its Traffic Signs (Application) Regulations 2003,  explicitly included Part I of the TSRGD into Manx law, but not the other parts of that legislation. One of the consequences of this partial incorporation is that while in England and Wales speed limit signs had to appear on both sides of a carriageway until 2016, this was not necessary for the Isle of Man.  Likewise, an all-way stop is permissible in the Isle of Man, whilst it has been prohibited in Great Britain since 2002.

The use of the derestricted sign differs according to jurisdiction, in the Isle of Man it means no speed limit applies, whereas in Jersey it denotes a 40 mph speed limit, which is the highest permitted speed on the island.

Channel Islands 
Guernsey  and Jersey have a unique sign "Filter in turn", which is a give way without priority. It is similar to the all-way stops found elsewhere in the world, although there is no requirement to halt.

Jersey 
In Jersey, roads signs and markings are regulated by the Traffic Signs (Jersey) Order 1968.

The standard bus stop road marking (Diagram 1025) is painted white on Jersey roads, and a unique smaller bus stop marking is found at most stops, which lacks the stop cage.

By Article 18, the Minister for Infrastructure may cause a yellow line to be placed transverse across a minor road. This indicates a 'give way' rule, as normally indicated by double white dashed lines elsewhere. The standard give way triangle (Diagram 1023) is painted yellow, even at approaches to white give way lines at roundabouts.

Parking signage is considerably different. Unloading bays (Diagram 1018J) allow loading and unloading of goods and are painted yellow with yellow upright signs. Otherwise parking signs indicate 'paycard' or 'Disc' limit restrictions. A single yellow line (Diagram 1017) indicates a 24-hour waiting restriction.

At the end of all one-way roads, the marking 'NO ENTRY' is placed to ban entry for vehicles.

The Z-bend sign (Diagram 514) is prescribed and still used. The end of a cycle track can be indicated by a blue cycle track sign with a red stripe.

In Jersey, traffic signals follow the French pattern, omitting the red-amber phase.

In Jersey, there are less onerous requirements for the signage of speed limits than the UK. Repeater signs are never used for 40 mph, and are sometimes used for 30 mph where there are street lights (which would not be necessary in the UK). Furthermore, there is no requirement that speed limit signs appear on both sides of the carriageway (consequently they often only appear on one).

Guernsey 

Weight restriction signs in Guernsey use hundredweight ("cwt") as a unit rather than the tonne, although one cwt was redefined as exactly 50.8023 kg in 1991. 
Guernsey devolves road markings and signs to Alderney and Sark.  Sark does not permit road transport, aside from cycles and farm vehicles.  Alderney has some different road markings, but the signs are broadly the same as Guernsey.

Overseas territories
The Overseas territories have much more autonomy regarding their use of signs and these can vary quite significantly from those used in Great Britain.

Akrotiri and Dhekelia 
Road signs in Akrotiri and Dhekelia, on Cyprus, are controlled by the Ministry of Defence and maintain the same designs as the Republic of Cyprus.
Speeds are in kilometres per hour, distances are in kilometres.  Some signs are in Turkish as well as English and Greek.

Anguilla 
Anguilla mostly uses the same road signs as the United Kingdom with minor differences.  Anguilla's roads occasionally cross large dish drains requiring a vehicle to slow down to cross.  Because of this, the territory has its own unique dip sign.

Ascension Island 
Ascension Island mainly uses signs similar to the UK's, but the yellow diagonal signs common to the US are also found on the island.

Bermuda 
Bermuda mostly uses the same style as the United Kingdom, with some exceptions.  Speed limit signs are in kilometres per hour and occasionally miles per hour, and all limit signs have this marked. Longer distances are typically in kilometeres, however shorter distances are signed in yards. Height and width sign restrictions are in both imperial units and metric. No entry signs have "NO ENTRY" written in black down the centre as was often used in the UK prior to 1965.  Goods vehicles are prohibited by class rather than weight: a list of prohibited vehicle classes will usually accompany a generic "no lorries" sign.  Bermuda still uses the Z-bend sign, phased out in the UK since 1975.

British Indian Ocean Territory 
The British Indian Ocean Territory's road signs are modelled on those of the US's Manual on Uniform Traffic Control Devices.

Cayman Islands 
The road signs of the Cayman Islands are similar to the UK's; the only main difference is some signs have allowable alternatives from the US's Manual on Uniform Traffic Control Devices, mainly for parking restriction signs.  The warning sign for dead ends is one of the only signs to follow the US standard in the Road Code, although other US-influenced signs are listed for use near schools.

In practice, the Transport typeface is not used and signs are written in all caps. Pedestrian crossings are often marked with a US-style sign instead of a Belisha beacon.

Falkland Islands 

The Falkland Islands' road signs are similar to the UK.  There is an additional road sign used in the Falklands to denote a minefield.

Gibraltar 
The road signs of Gibraltar are similar to the UK, with some signs being reversed to reflect driving on the opposite side of the road.  There are some warning signs specific to Gibraltar, mainly to do with the unique wildlife of the territory.  Speed limits and distances are in metric, in keeping with the rest of the Iberian Peninsula. However, height and width clearance warning and regulatory signs are both in imperial and metric.

Montserrat 
The road signs of Montserrat are similar to those of the UK.  No entry signs have "NO ENTRY" written in red down the centre, similar to the design used in the Bahamas.

Pitcairn Island 
Road transport in Pitcairn is primarily by quad bike.  Signs are modelled on those of New Zealand, although they are not kept in step with New Zealand updates.  Pitcairn's uses a unique slow down sign seen in neither the UK nor New Zealand – a red octagon with "SLOW DOWN" in white.

Saint Helena 
The road signs on Saint Helena are similar to the UK's.

South Georgia and the South Sandwich Islands 
South Georgia and the South Sandwich Islands inherited the traffic regulations of the Falkland Islands when it was made a separate territory in 1985.  There are very few roads on the island and they are all gravel and unmarked.

Turks and Caicos Islands 
The lack of road signs and official street names in the Turks and Caicos Islands was blamed for emergency vehicles not reaching their destination promptly, the government has since embarked on a programme of labelling roads and installing signs.   Roads are labelled in a similar way to the US and Canada.  Road signs are similar to those of the UK, although older MUTCD-influenced signs, including US-style speed limit signs, have not been actively replaced and are still seen.

Brown signs are sometimes erroneously used instead of green to denote primary routes.  Officially, green is used for primary routes and white for local routes, as in the UK.  There are no traffic lights in the Turks and Caicos Islands, most intersections are roundabouts.

Virgin Islands 

The road signs of the Virgin Islands are similar to those of the US. The BVI drivers manual lists British-influenced signage with occasional differences, but in reality, all signs installed follow the Manual on Uniform Traffic Control Devices.

In 2018, new legislation was introduced in the Virgin Islands requiring that speed limits be labelled in both mph and km/h.

See also
 Highway Code
 Gaelic road signs in Scotland
 Road signs in Ireland
 Road signs in Wales
 Off-Network Tactical Diversion Route
 Signage
 Hong Kong

References
  This article contains quotations from United Kingdom traffic regulations and handbooks, available under the  Open Government Licence v3.0. © Crown copyright.

External links

Official government websites
Department for Transport traffic signs and signals index page
The Traffic Signs Regulations and General Directions 2002
The Highway Code - Traffic signs section
Know Your Traffic Signs - A Department for Transport publication detailing common road signs and their meanings.
The Traffic Signs Regulations and General Directions 2016

History
War to Worboys — a Roads.org.uk article about the Worboys Committee.

Other resources
Traffic signs: report of the committee on traffic signs for all-purpose roads – The 'Worboys report', a 1963 report, at the Internet Archive
Motorway Signs: Final Report of Advisory Committee for Traffic Signs on Motorways - The 'Anderson Report', a 1962 report for motorway signs, at the Internet Archive
Institute of Highway Engineers sign design technical gateway
British Road Design Project, curated by Patrick Murphy, celebrating the 50th Anniversary of the British Road Sign at the Design Museum, London

 
Driving in the United Kingdom
History of transport in the United Kingdom
History of transport in the Isle of Man